Algimantas is a Lithuanian masculine given name, often abbreviated as Algis, and may refer to:

Algimantas (born 10th century), Grand Duke of Lithuania and father of Ryngold
Algimantas Briaunis (born 1964), Lithuanian professional footballer/goalkeeper coach
Algimantas Butnorius (1946–2017), Lithuanian chess Grandmaster and a former World Senior Champion
Algimantas Dailidė (1921–2015), former Lithuanian Security Police (Saugumas) official
Algimantas Adolfas Jucys (1936–1997), Lithuanian theoretical physicist, mathematician
Algimantas Kezys (1928–2015), photographer born in Lithuania who has lived in the United States since 1950
Algimantas Liubinskas (born 1951), Lithuanian politician and former manager of the Lithuania national football team
Algimantas Masiulis (1931–2008), Lithuanian film and theater actor
Algimantas Merkevičius (born 1969), Lithuanian judoka
Algimantas Nasvytis (1928–2018), Lithuanian architect
Algimantas Norvilas (born 1953), Lithuanian politician
Algimantas Puipa (born 1951), Lithuanian film director and screenwriter
Algimantas Šalna (born 1959), Lithuanian biathlete and Olympic medalist
Algimantas Sakalauskas (born 1958), Lithuanian folk artist and wood sculptor
Algimantas Sėjūnas (born 1941), Lithuanian politician
Algimantas Valantinas (born 1961), Lithuanian judge
Algimantas Vincas Ulba (1939–2012), Lithuanian politician
Algimantas Žižiūnas (born 1940), Lithuanian photographer

See also
List of all pages that start with "Algimantas"

Lithuanian masculine given names